The ANU School of Music is a school in the Research School of Humanities and the Arts, which forms part of the College of Arts and Social Sciences of the Australian National University. It consists of four buildings, including the main School of Music building – which contains Llewellyn Hall – and the Peter Karmel Building.

The School of Music's teaching encompasses performance tuition, alongside musicianship, musicology, sound recording, and ethnomusicology.

History
The School of Music was established under the name Canberra School of Music in 1965 with Ernest Llewellyn as the founding Director. The original plans for the School were prepared in the 1960s when the Department of the Interior recognized the need to establish centres for art and music study in the national capital, with the vision of providing high-level performance and practice. Sir Richard Kingsland, Secretary of the Department from 1963 to 1970, provided valuable support for Ernest Llewellyn's vision. The Canberra School of Music was established in 1965. It was first located in the Canberra suburb of Manuka and in 1976 moved to its current site on Childers Street between the Australian National University and the city centre, becoming the first purpose-built music school facility in Australia.

Llewellyn's vision for the school was based on the Juilliard School; he regarded Isaac Stern, with whom he had studied at Juilliard and who was his longtime friend, as the "father" of the school. He set the School up with a hand-picked staff and a focus on the training of soloists, chamber and orchestral musicians. As part of his grand plan he also envisaged the development of a national symphony orchestra based in Canberra. This has never been established, although Canberra has its own professional part-time orchestra, the Canberra Symphony Orchestra, based in Llewellyn Hall.

Responsibility for the Canberra School of Music passed from the Department of the Interior to the Minister for Education and Science, John Gorton. Control was transferred in 1974, and Sir Richard was the first Chairman of the Canberra School of Music. The Kingsland Room in the School of Music is named in his honour. The current School of Music building was opened in 1976.

In 1988 the Canberra School of Music and the Canberra School of Art combined to form the Canberra Institute of the Arts, and amalgamated with the Australian National University as the ANU Institute of the Arts in 1992.

In 2001, the Peter Karmel Building was opened to house the Jazz and Percussion Areas, and the Centre for New Media Arts. An extension to the Music Library was completed at the same time. In 2004, the National Institute of the Arts was dissolved, with the Schools of Music and Art becoming part of what was then the ANU Faculty of the Arts.

In 2007–08 the future of the School of Music came under review by the Australian National University. In 2012 the School of Music was subject of heated public debate, as the University responded to an annual running loss of $3 million, with a reduction in the University's internal subsidy and overhaul of the School's curriculum and staffing arrangements. The Head of School at the time, Professor Walter resigned shortly after in June 2012 to take up the Headship of the Hong Kong Academy for Performing Arts. Professor Peter Tregear, a graduate of the University of Cambridge and a prominent conductor and musicologist, was appointed to replace him and took up his post in August 2012. Tregear, however, found the University management "hostile to his attempts to rebuild confidence in the School". Separately, the Commonwealth authority responsible for managing worker's compensation claims, Comcare, launched an investigation into a series of complaints relating to untenable workloads and a toxic work culture. Tregear resigned in August 2015.  In 2016 a review of the School led by former public service commissioner Andrew Podger backed Professor Tregear's assessment of poor governance and called for "an overhaul of its governance and financial management".

Kenneth Lampl, Head of School from March 2017 – 2019, described the commencement of his tenure as a "new era", but resigned amidst unsubstantiated allegations of plagiarism. Professor Kim Cunio was appointed as his successor less than two weeks later.

Staff

Some of the staff present as of December 2021 include:
 Kim Cunio (Head of School 2019–)
 Kenneth Lampl (film and video game composition)
 Larry Sitsky (piano and composition)
 David Pereira (cello)
 Tor Fromyhr (violin and viola)
 Christopher Sainsbury (composition)
 Alexander Hunter (composition)
 Edward Neeman (piano)
 Scott Davie (piano)
 Cheryl Barker (soprano)
 Miroslav Bukovsky (trumpet)
 John Mackey (saxophone)
 Samantha Bennett (music technology)
 Mark Sutton (drummer)

Past staff include:
 Nicolette Fraillon, (director 1998–2002)
 Don Banks (composition)
 Jim Cotter (composition)
 Alice Giles (harp)
 Geoffrey Lancaster (fortepiano and conducting)
 Dr David Worrall (composition)

Location, grounds and buildings

The School of Music complex is situated on the south-eastern edge of the Australian National University campus, between the School of Art and University Avenue, bordered on the north-western face by Childers Street.

The complex itself consists of four buildings; two of which are demountables. The demountable buildings, which are joined, were installed in the 1990s and house some of the graduate facilities as well as some administration and technical capacity of the Music area and are colloquially known as "The Shed".

The two permanent buildings, the main School of Music Building and the Peter Karmel building are both built in contemporary architectural styles.

Building

The main School of Music building was designed for the National Capital Development Commission in 1970 by architects Daryl Jackson and Evan Walker. The architectural works of Jackson at this time can be seen to be in parallel with those of noted U.S. architect Paul Rudolph, most notably his 1960s interpretations of Le Corbusier's later works.

The following, taken from the Australian National University's Heritage Factsheet on the School of music, provides a physical description of the building and its architectural merits and heritage:

The building is heritage-listed by:
 Royal Australian Institute of Architects (Ref: R031);
 ACT Heritage Register (Nominated);
 Commonwealth Heritage List (Place ID – 105636);
 National Trust of Australia (ACT) Classification List: Classified.

Refurbishments to the main School of Music building in 2008 after a storm caused serious damage to the roof have included the complete refurbishment of Llewellyn Hall.

Llewellyn Hall
The main School of Music building houses Llewellyn Hall, a 1,400-seat concert hall that not only hosts events of the School (including most of the Australian National University's graduation ceremonies), but is also the venue for concerts by musical organisations of the city (including the Canberra Symphony Orchestra, Canberra Youth Orchestra, Canberra Choral Society and The Llewellyn Choir) and the nation (such as the Australian Chamber Orchestra, and Musica Viva.

The ACT government provides Llewellyn Hall $200,000 each year in addition to the ANU's $1.6 million annual funding for outreach programs. The 2010 Loxton Review of the Arts in Canberra recommended that in regards to Llewellyn Hall, "with such significant support, the ACT Government should leverage considerably greater benefits for the ACT arts and public, based more on a sharing arrangement, with extended and more affordable access. If this is not possible, it may be necessary to consider whether ACT public arts funding could be more productively invested in the arts and music elsewhere". The Loxton report also recognized the vital contribution the ANU School of Music provided the ACT public.

Llewellyn Hall came about directly through the initiative of its namesake, Ernest Llewellyn, the founding Head of School and instigator of the Canberra School of Music project. Llewellyn's plans, drawn with renowned architect Daryl Jackson, provided for a large "lecture hall" (with seating for 1,300 people and full audio and lighting facilities), smaller rehearsal spaces, teaching studios and offices.

Peter Karmel Building
An addition to the School of Music is the Peter Karmel Building, opened in 2001. The work of MGT Architects, this building is discretely separate – both in a site planning and architectural manner – to the original building.

The Peter Karmel Building was designed as a new freestanding addition to the Canberra School of Music to accommodate numerous practice and performance functions for the School, with specific accommodation of the Jazz and Percussion Departments and the Australian Centre for Arts and Technology (ACAT). The two-storey building forms a new Entry Court to the School of Music complex and provides integrated connections between practice and performance spaces in both the original School and new addition. The façade design commission by artist Marie Hagerty was intended to be an opportunity for the artist to work with the large-scale architectural forms in their three-dimensional landscape setting to create a patterning, "marking", and enlivening of the glazed and solid surfaces of the building's exterior.

The building, named after former ANU Vice-Chancellor Professor Peter Karmel, was designed and project managed by Guida Mosely Brown Architects in conjunction with commissioned artist Marie Hagerty. It currently houses the Centre for New Media Arts, the Jazz Department and the Percussion Department. It also contains the fourth most important performance space in the ANU campus (after Llewellyn Hall, the Theatre Arts Performance Space and Theatre 1, the Home of Canberra Repertory), the Band Room.

References

Further reading
 William L. Hoffmann, The Canberra School of Music: The First 25 Years, 1965–1990 (Acton, ACT: CSM, 1990).

External links
 

Music schools in Australia
Australian National University
Buildings and structures in Canberra